Beta-hexosaminidase subunit beta is an enzyme that in humans is encoded by the HEXB gene.

Hexosaminidase B is the beta subunit of the lysosomal enzyme beta-hexosaminidase that, together with the cofactor GM2 activator protein, catalyzes the degradation of the ganglioside GM2, and other molecules containing terminal N-acetyl hexosamines.  Beta-hexosaminidase is composed of two subunits, alpha and beta, which are encoded by separate genes.  Both beta-hexosaminidase alpha and beta subunits are members of family 20 of glycosyl hydrolases.  Mutations in the alpha or beta subunit genes lead to an accumulation of GM2 ganglioside in neurons and neurodegenerative disorders termed the GM2 gangliosidoses.  Beta subunit gene mutations lead to Sandhoff disease (GM2-gangliosidosis type II).

Structure

Gene 
The HEXB gene lies on the chromosome location of 5q13.3 and consists of 14 exons, spanning 35-40Kb.

Protein 

HEXB consists of 556 amino acid residues and weighs 63111Da.

Function 

HEXB is one of the two subunits forming β-hexosaminidase which functions as a glycosyl hydrolase that remove β-linked nonreducing-terminal GalNAc or GlcNAc residues in the lysosome. Inability of HEXB will lead toβ-hexosaminidase defect and result in a group of recessive disorders called GM2 gangliosidoses, characterized by the accumulation of GM2 ganglioside.

Clinical significance 

Genetic defects in HEXB can result in the accumulation of GM2 ganglioside in neural tissues and two of three lysosomal storage diseases collectively known as GM2 gangliosidosis, of which Sandhoff disease (defects in the β subunit) is the best studied one. Patients present with neurosomatic manifestations. Therapeutic effects of Hex subunit gene transduction have been examined on Sandhoff disease model mice. Intracerebroventricular administration of the modified β-hexosaminidase B to Sandhoff mode mice restored the β-hexosaminidase activity in the brains, and reduced the GM2 ganglioside storage in the parenchyma.

Interactions 

HEXB has been found to interact with HEXA and ganglioside.

References

Further reading